Lamberto Mari (born 7 September 1933) is an Italian diver. He competed at the 1952 Summer Olympics and the 1960 Summer Olympics.

References

External links
 
 

1933 births
Living people
Italian male divers
Olympic divers of Italy
Divers at the 1952 Summer Olympics
Divers at the 1960 Summer Olympics
Sportspeople from Florence